Holenstein is a surname. Notable people with the surname include:

Cameron Holenstein (born 1995), South African rugby union player
Claudio Holenstein (born 1990), Swiss footballer
Elmar Holenstein (born 1937), Swiss philosopher
Konrad Holenstein (born 1948), Liechtensteiner retired football striker and manager
Thomas Holenstein (1896-1962), Swiss politician

See also
Hollenstein